Taigo Vital Amorim de Araujo, commonly known as Taigo (born 28 May 1997) is a Brazilian football defender playing for Portuguese side CD Operário in the Liga Meo Azores.

Career
Taigo was born in Telêmaco Borba, in state of Paraná, Brazil. As a youngster, Taigo participated in motocross championships in state of Parana in Brazil.

Taigo started his football career at Coritiba U-13. Afterwards, he went through  Silvio Pereira school, Colégio Positivo with Anderson Valério, and CER Aquárius with Edilson Pukanski. By 2015 he had 7 Paraná youth state championships, two titles of Gradisca Tournament in Italy, and a Brazilian championship in under-15 level.

He begin playing for Coritiba B team since 2013 and regularly since 2015

In summer 2018 he moved to Europe and signed with Serbian newly-promoted top-league side FK Dinamo Vranje. He made his debut in the 2018–19 Serbian SuperLiga on August 26, 2018, in a home game against FK Zemun, a 1–0 victory.

During the winter season-break, he returned to Brazil and played in 2019 first with Sport Club São Paulo and then with Guarany Sporting Club, better known as Guarany from Sobral.

In the 2020–21 season he made a new attempt in Europe, this time by signing with Portuguese side CD Operário, located in the Azores Islands.

References

1997 births
Living people
Brazilian footballers
Brazilian expatriate footballers
Association football forwards
Coritiba Foot Ball Club players
FK Dinamo Vranje players
Serbian SuperLiga players
Expatriate footballers in Serbia
Sport Club São Paulo players
Guarany Sporting Club players
Expatriate footballers in Portugal